Bellingham High School may refer to:
 Bellingham High School (Washington) Bellingham, Washington, U.S.
 Bellingham High School (Massachusetts) Bellingham, Massachusetts, U.S.